Hood To Coast is a long distance relay race that starts at Mount Hood and continues nearly 200 miles to the Oregon Coast. Known as "the mother of all relays", it is the largest running and walking relay in the world, with 12,600 runners in the Hood To Coast relay and 19,000 total participants, including spinoff events like the Portland To Coast Walk and Portland To Coast Challenge Run Relay. Founded in 1982, Hood To Coast is extremely popular and has filled its team limit for the past 30 years, most of the time on opening day of the entrance lottery. 

The race is held annually in late August, traditionally on the Friday and Saturday before the Labor Day weekend. Teams of 12 runners take turns running legs along the course. Walking and running teams may choose to compete in the Portland To Coast Walk or Portland To Coast Challenge respectively, both of which are held in conjunction with the main Hood To Coast Relay and start near downtown Portland instead of Mount Hood.

History

The relay was founded by Bob Foote, who was President of the Oregon Road Runners Club and an ultra-marathon runner. The first relay in 1982 drew eight teams that ran 165 miles from Timberline to Kiwanda Beach near Pacific City, Oregon.  The relay grew rapidly to over 400 teams by 1986.  In 1989, the finish area was moved to Seaside where it remains today.

Cancer research and fundraising has long been part of the event. Over the past ten years, the race has raised nearly $7 million for the Providence Cancer Institute, making it the second-largest road race cancer fundraising program in the nation.

In 2006, Felicia Hubber, joined the organization to oversee race logistics, as Race Director and Chairperson, overseeing the long term vision and Hood To Coast mission moving forward. In 2019, the Hood & Portland To Coast Relays and HTC Race Series became a certified B Corporation.

Additional events 
Hood To Coast hosts several one day relays as well with HTC Seabrook, HTC Windy River, and HTC High Desert (Central Oregon). Hood To Coast went international in 2016 and annually hosts Hood To Coast China, or "H2C China" in conjunction with Yao Ming's company, Starz Sports. Each summer, Chinese, American and other international runners in HTC China (limited to 400 teams) start on the mountain at Thaiwoo Ski Resort (site of the 2022 Winter Olympics), and traverse a mountainous course to its destination 110 miles later in Zhangjiakou. Additional annual international HTC events include Hood To Coast Taiwan, Hood To Coast Israel, and Hood To Coast Hainan.

Teams
Open to all interested competitors, but limited to 1,050 twelve-person teams, Hood To Coast has filled its limit for 30 consecutive years and on opening day for the past 24 straight years.  Teams each year are chosen by lottery from entries postmarked on opening day of registration,  (first Wednesday of October).  The Portland To Coast Walk & Challenge Relays are limited to 400 and 50 teams respectively; entries are accepted on a first-come-first-served basis until all spaces are filled.

Course
The  Hood To Coast course consists of 36 legs; each team member runs three in rotation. The course is run primarily on paved roads and multi-use off-street trails, with small portions of the course on sidewalks and gravel roads. Teams in the full Hood To Coast Relay must complete the course within a 36-hour time limit.

Teams start on Friday between 3:00 a.m. and 2:00 p.m. in staggered waves of approximately 15 teams every 5 minutes. Teams are seeded based on previous race pace times (extrapolated based on a specific deterioration factor over three legs, taking into account additional factors) for each team's submitted roster.  Thus the flow of teams through the 35 exchange points and finish line remains relatively smooth, with all teams finishing the race by the closing time of 9 p.m. on Saturday.

The course starts at Timberline Lodge at the  level of Mount Hood, and proceeds down Timberline Road to Government Camp.

Runners proceed west along U.S. Route 26 to the towns of Sandy and Gresham, where the route proceeds along the Springwater Corridor Trail to the Sellwood neighborhood in southeast Portland.  The route then proceeds north along the paved Springwater/Willamette River Trail and crosses the Tilikum Crossing Bridge west into downtown Portland.

After going over the Tilikum Crossing Bridge, runners proceed north along Naito Parkway in downtown Portland along the west bank of the Willamette River and onto U.S. Route 30 to St. Helens.  From there onward, the route passes through hilly rural and sometimes unpaved backroads through the forested communities of Mist and Birkenfeld on the way to the beach finish line party in Seaside.

The Portland To Coast Walk & Challenge Run Relay follow the last 24 legs (130 miles) of the course, starting from the Tilikum Crossing Bridge in downtown Portland.  Each participant in these relays walk or run two legs in rotation.

Logistics and atmosphere
Each twelve-person team is allowed two vehicles no larger than a standard-sized van.  While the vans generally follow the race course in support of their runners, certain narrower portions of the course require one van to make a predetermined detour route to alleviate traffic congestion.  Teams typically give themselves funny names, dress in costume, and some decorate their vehicles according to a theme.

Teams are expected to provide their own provisions. Local schools, granges and churches along the route provide sleeping areas, food, and showers to participants as fundraisers. Teams compete in divisions and are awarded for a top six placement. At the large finish festivities during the beach party, photos, an expansive beer/wine garden, food and live music keep participants and spectators going throughout the day and evening.

All teams that include at least one member living within a  radius of Portland are required to provide three volunteers to ensure adequate personnel at turns and exchange points along the 200 mile race course.

Media
The race was the subject of the 2011 film Hood to Coast, directed by Christoph Baaden.  The film chronicles four teams, their back story and inspiration for running, while watching their heartfelt experiences in the race.

References

External links
 Hood to Coast website
 Portland to Coast Walk website

Long-distance relay races
Sports competitions in Oregon
Recurring sporting events established in 1982
1982 establishments in Oregon
Annual events in Oregon